The Ramnath Goenka Excellence in Journalism Awards (RNG Awards) are one of the awards in India in the field of journalism. Named after Ramnath Goenka, the awards have been held annually since 2006, with the 12th edition being held in 2017. The awards are given for both print journalism as well as broadcast journalism, with a total of 25 different prizes being awarded in 2017 for excellence in journalism during 2016.

Past winners have included Kuldip Nayar (Lifetime award), Siddharth Varadarajan (The Hindu), Shashi Tharoor, Dionne Bunsha, Muzamil Jaleel (The Indian Express), Rajdeep Sardesai, Karan Thapar (CNN IBN), Kishalay Bhattacharjee, Ravish Kumar, Umashankar Singh (Mojo) NDTV, Nidhi Razdan (NDTV), Neelesh Mishra (Hindustan Times), Christophe Jaffrelot (The Caravan), Mark Tully (BBC), Arnab Goswami (Times Now) and Sudhir Chaudhary (Zee News) among others. Foreign journalists to have won the award for Foreign Correspondent Covering India include Amelia Gentleman (The New York Times International Edition) and Stephanie Nolen (The Globe and Mail).

The chief guest during the second award ceremony in 2007 was the former President of India, A.P.J Abdul Kalam. Over the years chief guests at the event have included Prime Minister of India Narendra Modi, former Prime Minister Manmohan Singh, former Chief Justice of India K.G. Balakrishnan, Vice- President of India Venkaiah Naidu, Finance Minister of India Arun Jaitley, Lok Sabha Speaker Sumitra Mahajan, former vice president Hamid Ansari, former president Pratibha Patil and former chief justice of India P Sathasivam. The Ramnath Goenka Memorial Debate, started in 2007, is also held during the event.

Award categories 
Over the years, the awards categories have changed. Awards can remain ungiven if there is no suitable winner, such as for the Ramnath Goenka Memorial Award For Lifetime Achievement In Journalism. The awards also have a cash prize, which over the years has also changed. Award categories during the 12th edition included:

Print 

 Reporting From J&K And The Northeast
 Hindi
 Regional Languages
 Environmental Reporting
 Uncovering India Invisible
 Business & Economic Journalism
 Political Reporting
 Sports Journalism
 On The Spot Reporting
 Investigative Reporting
 Feature Writing
 Foreign Correspondent
 Commentary And Interpretative Writing
 Civic Journalist
 Photo Journalism

Broadcast 

 Reporting From J&K And The Northeast
 Hindi
 Regional Languages
 Environmental Reporting
 Uncovering India Invisible
 Business & Economic Journalism
 Political Reporting
 Sports Journalism
 On The Spot Reporting
 Investigative Reporting

Past award categories 
Past awards have included categories such as 'Excellence in HIV/AID Reporting Award', a joint initiative of Johns Hopkins Bloomberg School of Public Health, United States Agency for International Development (USAID) and Indian Express Group. Other past awards include 'Priya Chandrashekhar Memorial Award For Excellence In Editing' and the 'Prakash Kardaley Memorial Award For Civic Journalism'. In 2020, the 'conflict reporting' category was removed for the year.

Full list of winners 
Please see https://rngfoundation.com/awards/#pastaward

Gallery

See also 
 Chameli Devi Jain Award for Outstanding Women Mediapersons
 https://rngfoundation.com/awards/

References

External links 
 Official website of the Ramnath Goenka Excellence in Journalism Awards

Indian Express Limited
Indian journalism awards
2006 establishments in India